During the 2012–13 1. FC Heidenheim season the club played in the 3. Liga, the third tier of German football. It was the club's fourth season in this league, having been promoted from the Regionalliga in 2009.

The club also took part in the 2012–13 edition of the DFB-Pokal, the German Cup, but was knocked out in the first round by 2. Bundesliga side VfL Bochum.

1. FC Heidenheim also took part in the 2012–13 edition of the Württemberg Cup, having reached the quarter finals after a 7–0 win over VfL Mühlheim.

League table

Matches

Legend

Friendly matches

3. Liga

DFB-Pokal

Sources

External links
 2012–13 1. FC Heidenheim season at Weltfussball.de 
 2012–13 1. FC Heidenheim season at kicker.de 
 2012–13 1. FC Heidenheim season at Fussballdaten.de 

Heidenheim
1. FC Heidenheim seasons